Nupserha antennalis is a species of beetle in the family Cerambycidae. It was described by Karl Jordan in 1894.

Varieties
 Nupserha antennalis var. capitata Jordan, 1894
 Nupserha antennalis var. holonigripennis Breuning, 1950
 Nupserha antennalis var. obscurata Breuning, 1958

References

antennalis
Beetles described in 1894